Syncordulia is a genus of dragonflies.

The genus includes these species:
Syncordulia gracilis  - yellow presba
Syncordulia legator  - gilded presba 
Syncordulia serendipator  - rustic presba
Syncordulia venator  - mahogany presba

References

Anisoptera genera
Synthemistidae